Akyayla can refer to:

 Akyayla, Burdur
 Akyayla, Dursunbey